Eaton Square is a rectangular, residential garden square in London's Belgravia district. It is the largest square in London. It is one of the three squares built by the landowning Grosvenor family when they developed the main part of Belgravia in the 19th century that are named after places in Cheshire — in this case Eaton Hall, the Grosvenor country house.  It is larger but less grand than the central feature of the district, Belgrave Square, and both larger and grander than Chester Square.  The first block was laid out by Thomas Cubitt from 1827.  In 2016 it was named as the "Most Expensive Place to Buy Property in Britain", with a full terraced house costing on average £17 million — many of such town houses have been converted, within the same, protected structures, into upmarket apartments.

The six adjoining, tree-planted, central gardens of Eaton Square are Grade II listed on the Register of Historic Parks and Gardens. All of the buildings (No.s 1–7, 8-12A, 14–23, 24 and 24a to 48, 51–62, 63–66, Eaton House (No. 66a), 67–71, 72, 73–82, 83–102 and 103–118) are statutorily listed, specifically at Grade II* save as to 1 to 7 and 63 to 66a which are in the mainstream, initial category of grade II. No.s 103 to 105 are leased and internally converted into the Belgian Embassy, as is No. 106 for the Bolivian Embassy.

The red telephone booth, of the "K6" edition outside No. 103, is Grade II listed.

Overview

The houses in Eaton Square are large, predominantly three-bay-wide buildings, joined in regular terraces in a classical style, with four or five main storeys, plus attic and basement and a mews house behind. Most of the houses are faced with white stucco, but some are faced with underlying high-quality brickwork.

As to roads: the whole rectangle is divided into six compartments or zones as it is bisected lengthways by the Victoria or Buckingham Palace approach way to the King's Road which is very diversely and briefly successively named northeast of Sloane Square).  Crossways it is spanned by four less important roads, all of which change name before during and after their transit across the square. All of the roads while in transit across the square assume the name Eaton Square and most of them are one-way, with no full outer circuit in any one direction permitted or possible.

In 1900, the Welsh Industrial Association held an exhibition at 83 Eaton Square, rented by the Winifred, Countess of Dundonald, the event was visited by Alexandra, Princess of Wales. The person presiding over the refreshment room exhibition was Kathleen, Duchess of Wellington, assisted by Mrs. A.J. Warden,  with a party of attractive ladies wearing the national costume of Wales accompanied by Ivor and Albertina Herbert of Llanover's Harpist playing for the occasion.

Between 1916 and 1917, building 87 briefly became the 'Countess of Dundonald hospital', treating many of the wounded in the Great War, George V & Queen Consort Mary of Teck visited the patients at the hospital, they were greeted by the Staff and Countess of Dundonald herself.

Before World War II, homes on the street ranked as those of the upper class but was outranked by comparators in Belgrave Square, Grosvenor Square, St James's Square or Park Lane.  The aftermath of that war saw most of those converted to commercial and institutional uses, leaving the square almost wholly residential, raising its prominence. Some of the houses remain undivided but many have been internally converted into flats or multi-storey instances (maisonettes) by permission or instruction of the Grosvenor Estate. These are often lateral conversions – that is, they cut across more than one of the original houses – let under typical long leases across the uppermost price bracket, their exact price depending on size, lease duration and amenity. The façades of the square remain as imagined and built. Most but not all of the freeholds still belong to the Grosvenor Group. Hugh Grosvenor, 7th Duke of Westminster, who inherited the Duke of Westminster title from his father Gerald Grosvenor in 2016, uses one as his London home. Until the 1920s his predecessors lived in Grosvenor House the mansion forerunner to the Grosvenor House Hotel on Park Lane facing Hyde Park.

Co-fronting the north-east end is St Peter's, a 200-feet-long, tree-lined Church of England church, in a classical style, fronted by a six-columned Ionic portico behind which is a slender clock tower. It was designed by Henry Hakewill and built between 1824 and 1827 (during the square's building).

Between 1940 and 1944 the Belgian government in exile occupied its three numbers which have been long used as that country's embassy in Britain and further premises in central London as their lesser homes and offices.

Fictional references
Eaton Square
Adam Verver and his wife, the former Charlotte Stant live at the square in the last complete major novel by Henry James, The Golden Bowl. 
In the original newspaper piece that was expanded into Gilbert and Sullivan's Trial by Jury, the judge invites the rest of the cast to his house in "Five hundred and eleven, Eaton Square" for the wedding breakfast. 
In Angela Carter's last novel, Wise Children, Eaton Square is visited by Peregrine Hazard after returning by cab from the beach. 
In Anthony Trollope's novel The Bertrams Sir Henry Harcourt and his unhappy bride Lady Harcourt (Caroline Waddington) take a house in the square after their marriage. 
In Jeffrey Archer's First Among Equals,  Charles Gurney Seymour, future cabinet minister and son of the Earl of Bridgwater, and his wife Lady Fiona, daughter of the Duke of Falkirk, live in Eaton Square.
BBC 1938 radio series Send for Paul Temple bases him in the street; readers find him at flat "№26A" in novelization Paul Temple and the Tyler Mystery
Lady Rosamund Painswick lives at the square in Downton Abbey.
Eaton Place
The Bellamy family of Upstairs, Downstairs lived in "165" Eaton Place, one of the grand approach ways.

Notable residents
No. 1: Lewis Pelly - British East India Company officer, imperial army and political officer, Conservative MP, Lord Boothby – parliamentarian, political commentator and friend of Ronnie Kray
No. 2: Diana Mitford, Lady Mosley
No. 36: Ruth Roche, Baroness Fermoy – long-time confidante of Queen Elizabeth, the Queen Mother
No. 37: Neville Chamberlain – British Prime Minister
No. 37: Joachim von Ribbentrop – German Ambassador to London 
No. 39: Lady Aline Caroline Cholmondeley, daughter of George Cholmondeley, 5th Marquess of Cholmondeley and Sybil Cholmondeley, Marchioness of Cholmondeley. She died on 30 June 2015 at age 98.
No. 42: Peter Thorneycroft – British Chancellor of the Exchequer
No. 44: Prince Metternich – Austrian statesman
No. 45: George Tryon – British Admiral who died in the sinking of HMS Victoria in 1893
No. 54: Vivien Leigh – Oscar-winning actress; Luise Rainer – Oscar-winning actress
No. 68: Thomas Campbell Robertson, British colonial administrator in India, died here in 1863; Barry Gibb of the pop group the Bee Gees, 1970.
No. 72: Sir Robert Helpmann – actor, dancer and choreographer, mostly remembered for his role in the film Chitty Chitty Bang Bang. 
No. 75: Rex Harrison – Oscar-winning actor
No. 80: George Peabody – American banker and philanthropist
No. 82: Queen Wilhelmina of the Netherlands in 1940.
 No. 84: Stafford Harry Northcote, Viscount Saint Cyres – diplomat and historian
No. 86: Lord Halifax – British Foreign Secretary
No. 93: Stanley Baldwin – British Prime Minister
No. 97: Sir Francis Scott Bt and Lady Scott of Great Barr (d. 1863 and 1909 respectively)
No. 99: Admiral of the Fleet Sir John West
No. 100: Hugh Grosvenor, 7th Duke of Westminster - freeholder of most of the square and most of the surrounding district
No. 102: Instituto Cervantes
No. 112: Admiral of the Fleet Sir Henry Codrington; Leo Amery - politician and minister in Churchill's wartime cabinet; and his son Julian Amery, Baron Amery of Lustleigh, Conservative MP.
No. 114: Harry Stuart Goodhart-Rendell – architect
No. 106: The embassy of Bolivia
No. 115: Admiral of the Fleet Sir George Seymour
No. 118: Sir William Corry, Bt., of Dunraven, Co. Antrim (d. 1926)
No. 57 Lower Belgrave St (corner of Eaton Sq.) Roman Abramovich - Russian billionaire and the main owner of Chelsea Football Club
George Soros – Hungarian-born hedge fund manager.
John King, Baron King of Wartnaby
Princess Katherine of Greece and Denmark 
Alfred Robens, Baron Robens of Woldingham – politician and chairman of the National Coal Board 
 Mr and Mrs Ernest Aldrich Simpson from 1958
Sarah, Duchess of York, from 2014

Footnotes and citations

Footnotes

Citations

External links

1827 in London
Belgravia
Grade II listed parks and gardens in London
Houses completed in 1853
Squares in the City of Westminster
Thomas Cubitt buildings
Communal gardens